Sylvio Carvalho (born 1 April 1956) is a Brazilian sports shooter. He competed at the 1980 Summer Olympics and the 1984 Summer Olympics.

References

1956 births
Living people
Brazilian male sport shooters
Olympic shooters of Brazil
Shooters at the 1980 Summer Olympics
Shooters at the 1984 Summer Olympics
Sportspeople from Rio de Janeiro (city)
Shooters at the 1979 Pan American Games
Pan American Games silver medalists for Brazil
Medalists at the 1979 Pan American Games
Pan American Games medalists in shooting